Alyque Padamsee (5 March 1928 – 17 November 2018) was an Indian theatre personality and ad film maker. He played Muhammad Ali Jinnah in the 1982 British period film Gandhi.

Besides being involved in Indian theatre as an actor and producer, Padamsee was an advertising professional who once headed the advertising company Lintas Bombay.

Early life and education
Padamsee was born in Bombay in 1928 into a traditional Khoja Muslim Ismaili family hailing from the Kutch region of Gujarat. Ancestors of Padamsee family originally belonged to the Charan community of Kutch who converted to Islam and joined Khoja caste. The name Padamsee derives from the Sanskrit Padmasinh (padma=lotus, sinh=lion, usually a title). The family had been settled in the nearby Kathiawar region for some generations; Padamsee's grandfather, who had been the sarpanch (headman) of Vāghnagar, a village in Bhavnagar district, was famous for having distributed his entire granary to the village during a famine.

Padamsee's father, Jafferseth Padamsee, was an affluent businessman who owned 10 buildings and also ran a glassware and furniture business. His mother, Kulsumbai Padamsee, was a home-maker. She was Jaffer Padamsee's second wife and she bore him eight children. Her eldest son was Sultan Padamsee, also known as Bobby, a theatre actor who was reputedly gay and died by suicide at the age of twenty-three. Alyque was born after three girls; one of his older sisters, Zarina, was the wife of Hamid Sayani, brother of Ameen Sayani. Another of his sisters was Roshan Alkazi, wife of Ebrahim Alkazi. One of One of Padamsee's (distant) cousins is the painter Akbar Padamsee, son of Hasanali Padamsee. Although rich, this trading family was not well-educated, and neither of his parents had finished school. Alyque and his brothers (but not his sisters) were the first in the family to attend school and learn English there; the parents later picked up a smattering of the language from their sons. Raised in an extremely traditional environment, in a devout Muslim family, Padamsee described himself as an agnostic who disclaimed all religion by the age of 18. He was educated at  St. Xavier's College, Mumbai.

Personal life
Padamsee's first wife was Pearl Padamsee, a Christian divorcee born to a Baghdadi Jewish mother and Christian father. Pearl's first husband had been a Hindu, and she had two children by that marriage, a daughter named Rohini (1951-61) and a son, Ranjit Chowdhry (1955-2020). Rohini Chowdhry died at age 10, very shortly after Pearl and Padamsee got married. Ranjit became an actor and died in 2020. Padamsee and Pearl had one daughter together, Raell Padamsee, who runs the acting school founded by her mother. Padamsee and Pearl were divorced not long after the birth of Raeel, but Pearl chose to retain her married name 'Padamsee' for the rest of her life.

After his first divorce, Padamsee had an extended relationship with Dolly Thakore, another Christian divorcee. Again, Dolly had been married to a Hindu gentleman, Dilip Thakore, and divorced him to cohabit with Padamsee. For all intents and purposes, Padamsee and Dolly were assumed to be husband and wife by the world. They had a son together, Quasar Thakore-Padamsee, also a theatre professional. 

After separating from Dolly, Padamsee married Sharon Prabhakar, a third Christian divorcee who is twenty-seven years younger than him. Born to a Hindu father and a Christian mother, Sharon had previously been married to Bryan Mascarenhas. Padamsee and Sharon had a daughter together, Shazahn Padamsee. Like all her father's other children and step-children, Shazahn is a small-time actress.

Advertising

For 14 years, Padamsee was the Chief Executive who built Lintas India to be one of the top agencies in the country. He went on to become the Regional Co-ordinator of Lintas South Asia. Known as the 'Father of Modern Indian Advertising',  Padamsee has built over 100 brands. He was the only Indian to be voted into the International Clio Hall of Fame, the Oscars of World Advertising. He was Chairman of the London Institute of Corporate Training at which he conducted courses on leadership training and ideation. His best seller book on Advertising entitled A Double Life is prescribed in business schools. 

Padamsee created Lalitaji for Surf, Cherry Charlie for Cherry Blossom Shoe Polish, the MRF Muscle Man, the Liril girl in the waterfall, the Kamasutra couple, Hamara Bajaj, the TV detective Karamchand, the Fair & Handsome brand, etc. Recently he created the Idea of a Fatwa against Terrorism which was announced by the Grand Mufti of the Deoband Uloom.  For the Golden Jubilee of The Indian Institute Technology Bombay his idea of starting an initiative to create 10 Great Ideas That Will Change The World In The Next 50 Years caused a great deal of excitement. He was also working on AIDS Prevention Idea with the Dept. of Biotechnology.

He was the CEO of AP Advertising Pvt. Ltd., a firm of Image and Communications Consultants, who have provided consultancy services to a number of national and multinational companies, as Creative Advisor.

Theatre

Padamsee is also known for his English language theatre productions in India like Evita, Jesus Christ Superstar, Tuglaq, and his latest, Broken Images, which was invited to the Kennedy Center in Washington, DC in 2011. He was conferred the Lifetime Achievement Award for Theatre by the Sangeet Natak Akademi; and this January the Tagore Ratna. Internationally, he is known for his portrayal of Muhammad Ali Jinnah in Sir Richard Attenborough's Gandhi.

He worked for the Citizens for Justice & Peace, the Citizens Action Group, and he was on the Advisory Council of the Indian Institute of Technology (IIT Bombay). Earlier he worked as Communications Advisor to Chandrababu Naidu, the former Chief Minister of Andhra Pradesh State. Recently  he was appointed to the Prime Minister's AIDS Task Force (Earlier served as Advisor to Prime Minister Rajiv Gandhi on Commercial Television).

Awards
 The President of India conferred on him the Padmashri in 2000.
 The Advertising Club of Mumbai named him "Advertising Man of the Century".
 Received Sangeet Natak Akademi Tagore Ratna in 2012.

Bibliography
A Double Life: My Exciting Years In Theatres and Advertising  (autobiography)

References

External links

 
 Alyque Padamsee at Penguin India

1928 births
2018 deaths
Indian advertising people
Indian agnostics
Indian male stage actors
Recipients of the Padma Shri in arts
Artists from Mumbai
St. Xavier's College, Mumbai alumni
Indian theatre directors
Indian Ismailis
Gujarati people
People from Kutch district
Indian tax resisters
Charan
Khoja Ismailism
Recipients of the Sangeet Natak Akademi Award